Borna Sosa (born 21 January 1998) is a Croatian professional footballer who plays as a left-back or a left-wing back for Bundesliga club VfB Stuttgart and the Croatia national team.

Career

Dinamo Zagreb
Sosa was born in the Prečko neighbourhood of Zagreb to Herzegovinian Croat parents from Gradac, near Posušje. He was a youth player for Dinamo Zagreb. He was given his Prva HNL debut for Dinamo by coach Zoran Mamić on 7 March 2015 in a 2–0 home win over Zagreb, starting and playing the full 90 minutes. On 10 May 2016, he played full 90 minutes in the Croatian Cup Final as Dinamo defeated Slaven Belupo 2–1. He made his European debut on 12 July 2016, when coach Zlatko Kranjčar substituted him for Alexandru Mățel in the 66th minute of the 2–1 victory over Vardar in Skopje in the Champions League second qualifying round. Over the course of four seasons at Dinamo, Sosa made 41 appearances and six assists for his hometown club.

VfB Stuttgart 
On 14 May 2018, Sosa signed a five-year-contract with VfB Stuttgart, with effect from 1 July. He made his debut for Stuttgart on 26 August, after being substituted on for Emiliano Insúa in the 84th minute of the 1–0 loss to Mainz. However, due to frequent injuries, Sosa's minutes were significantly reduced in his first season with Stuttgart, which saw the club relegated to the 2. Bundesliga. The injuries continued during his second season as well, resulting in Sosa making only 24 appearances for Stuttgart in his first two seasons. On 16 December 2019, he scored his debut goal for Stuttgart in a 1–1 draw with Darmstadt. However, the 2020–21 season was Sosa's breakthrough season, as he found form and consistency in Pellegrino Matarazzo's 3–4–2–1 formation. His performances in the Bundesliga earned him praise and comparisons to David Beckham, whom he named his football role model alongside David Alaba. On 27 November 2020, he extended his contract until 2025. He finished the season with nine assists on his account.

At the beginning of the 2021–22 season, on 7 August, Sosa captained Stuttgart for the first time in a DFB-Pokal match against Dynamo Berlin, scoring and assisting in the 6–0 victory. Seven days later, on the first matchday of Bundesliga, Sosa provided Marc-Oliver Kempf and Hamadi Al Ghaddioui with a hat-trick of assists as Stuttgart defeated Greuther Fürth 5–1.

International career
Sosa represented Croatia at the 2015 UEFA Under-17 Euro and the 2015 FIFA U-17 World Cup. In May 2018, he was named in Zlatko Dalić's preliminary 32-man squad for the 2018 World Cup in Russia, but did not make the final 23. He was named in Nenad Gračan's squad for the UEFA Under-21 Euro 2019 and Igor Bišćan's squad for the UEFA Under-21 Euro 2021. However, he was ruled out of the latter squad at the last minute due to a knee injury.

On 7 May 2021, it was reported by Sportske novosti and Sky Sport that Sosa was given German citizenship, on Germany coach Joachim Löw's initiative, through his mother Vesna who was born and raised in Berlin, and was expected to represent Germany at the UEFA Euro 2020. A day later, on 8 May, Sosa himself confirmed the information to 24sata. However, on 11 May, Oliver Bierhoff, the technical director of the German Football Association, announced that Sosa is ineligible to play for Germany according to the FIFA rules. Two days later, on 13 May, Sosa issued an official apology to the Croatian public, Croatia national team fans and the Croatian Football Federation via the Federation's website.

Sosa earned his first call-up to the national team on 16 August 2021, ahead of the September World Cup qualifiers against Russia, Slovakia and Slovenia. He made his debut on 1 September in a goalless draw against Russia, being named in the starting lineup. On 14 November, in the crucial qualifier against the same opponent, Sosa caused Fyodor Kudryashov's own goal, leading to Croatia's 1–0 victory and qualification for the World Cup. On 22 September 2022, he scored his debut goal for the national team in a 2–1 Nations League victory over Denmark.

Career statistics

Club

International

Scores and results list Croatia's goal tally first, score column indicates score after each Sosa goal.

Honours 

Dinamo Zagreb
 Prva HNL: 2015–16 , 2017–18
 Croatian Cup: 2015–16 , 2017–18
Croatia
 FIFA World Cup third place: 2022

Individual
 2015 UEFA European Under-17 Championship Team of the Tournament

References

External links
 
 

1998 births
Living people
Footballers from Zagreb
Naturalized citizens of Germany
German people of Croatian descent
German people of Bosnia and Herzegovina descent
Association football fullbacks
Croatian footballers
German footballers 
Croatia youth international footballers
Croatia under-21 international footballers
Croatia international footballers
GNK Dinamo Zagreb players
GNK Dinamo Zagreb II players
VfB Stuttgart players
Croatian Football League players
First Football League (Croatia) players
Bundesliga players
2. Bundesliga players
2022 FIFA World Cup players
Croatian expatriate footballers
Expatriate footballers in Germany
Croatian expatriate sportspeople in Germany